Bruno Hinze-Reinhold (20 October 1877 – 26 December 1964) was a German pianist and music scholar. From 1916 to 1933 he was director of the music school and the Hochschule für Musik Franz Liszt, Weimar.

Life 
Hinze-Reinhold was born in Danzig in 1877 as the son of a doctor. From 1895 he received his piano training with Bruno Zwintscher, Robert Teichmüller and Alfred Reisenauer at the University of Music and Theatre Leipzig. In 1901 he moved to Berlin, where he taught at the Stern Conservatory and the Eichelberg Conservatory. He also became active as a chamber musician and piano accompanist. Together with the singer Susanne Dessoir he published the Dessoir albums in 1912.

In 1913 he became head of a piano training class at the Grand Ducal Music School in Weimar. In 1916 he became interim head of the institution. In the same year he received the title of professor and became director. Under his direction the music school was transformed into the Hochschule für Musik Franz Liszt, Weimar in 1930. Thereupon he moved back to Berlin and became a freelancer. Only in 1947 he returned to Weimar. Hinze-Reinhold was an important Liszt interpreter. He also included works by Schubert, Schumann and Chopin in his repertoire. In 1927 he formed together with Max Strub (violinist) and Walter Schulz (cellist) the Weimar Trio.

Hinze-Reinhold died in Weimar at the age of 87.

Writings 
 Lebenserinnerungen. (Edition Musik und Wort der Hochschule für Musik Franz Liszt Weimar. Vol. 1). Ed. by Michael Berg. Universitätsverlag, Weimar 1997, .

Literature 
 Karl Heller: Hinze-Reinhold, Bruno. In Friedrich Blume (ed.): Die Musik in Geschichte und Gegenwart (MGG). First edition, volume 16 (Supplement 2: Eardsen - Zweibrücken). Bärenreiter/Metzler, Kassel et al. 1976, DNB 550439609
 Wolfram Huschke: Hinze-Reinhold, Bruno. In Gitta Günther, Wolfram Huschke, Walter Steiner (ed.): Weimar: Lexikon zu Stadtgeschichte. Metzler, Weimar 1998, .
 Wolfram Huschke: Zukunft Musik: Eine Geschichte der Hochschule für Musik Franz Liszt Weimar. Böhlau, Cologne among others 2006, pp. 126ff., 200ff.

References

External links 
 
 Nachlass Bruno Hinze-Reinhold beim Archivportal Thüringen

1877 births
1964 deaths
20th-century classical pianists
German classical pianists
Male classical pianists
Musicians from Gdańsk
20th-century German male musicians